To Be Kind is the thirteenth studio album by American experimental rock band Swans, released on May 12, 2014. It was released as a triple LP, a double CD, and a two-CD deluxe edition that includes a live DVD of performances from Hellfest Open Air Festival, Pitchfork Music Festival and Primavera Sound Festival, as well as a digital download. Critical reception of the album was very positive, continuing a string of well-received albums from the band. The album peaked at number 37 on US Billboard 200, and debuted at number 38 on the UK Albums Chart. Both are the highest chartings that Swans had ever achieved on a studio album and it is the first time that the band cracked the top 40 in both countries.

Background
To Be Kind was produced by frontman Michael Gira and recorded by John Congleton at Sonic Ranch and at Congleton's studio in Dallas.  Rehearsing commenced at Sonic Ranch in October 2013 and recording began soon after.  Mixing was completed with Congleton in December in Dallas. Most of the music was developed while touring in 2012 and 2013. The album features special guests St. Vincent, Cold Specks, Little Annie and Bill Rieflin. On March 21, the song "A Little God in My Hands" as well as  the album artwork were revealed. Six images of babies' heads, created by Bob Biggs , were used for the album art.

Critical reception

Upon its release, To Be Kind was widely praised by music critics. At Metacritic, which assigns a normalized rating out of 100 to reviews from critics, the album received an average score of 88,  based on 35 reviews, indicating "universal acclaim". Mark Deming of AllMusic gave the album a positive review, stating:,"Michael Gira is a man unafraid to follow his muse wherever it may take him and To Be Kind is another example of his singular vision writ large without compromise." Anna Wilson of Clash praised the album, describing it as "Karlheinz Stockhausen’s jarring classicism, Captain Beefheart's twisted blues, and the industrialism of Einstürzende Neubauten coalescing into a swirling musical miasma." She also stated that the album is "near perfection." Benjamin Bland of Drowned in Sound gave the album a 10/10 score and stated, "This is an album that emphasises rather than establishes Swans' reconfirmed position at the top of the experimental rock tree, but that doesn’t make it any less of a thrill." He further commented, "Now that this mission has been completed there is space for To Be Kind, and future Swans records to affirm, rather than prove, that Swans are, and perhaps always have been, the greatest rock group on the face of the planet." Writing for Rolling Stone, Kory Grow compared the album to The Seer, as well as the 1996 effort Soundtracks for the Blind, noting how "Swans' sound has evolved so that they "don't just crush—they hypnotize".

Ross Horton of musicOMH gave the album a 5-star score, commenting, "Gira shows that the Swans resurgence isn’t a fluke." Stuart Berman of Pitchfork praised Gira's efforts on the album, stating, "He's responded in the best way possible: by producing a record that, in structure and scale, is every bit The Seers equal, yet possessed by a peculiar energy and spirit that proves all the more alluring in its dark majesty." Rory Gibb of The Quietus wrote, "By this point they've further coalesced into an inseparable entity. On To Be Kind we experience Swans as totality, all seething ebb and flow crafting music that seems to breathe of its own volition." He also stated that the album's songs "feel more fluid and open-ended than before, expressive and rich in possibility." Colm McAuliffe of The Skinny also gave the album a positive review, stating, "Despite the two-hour plus running time, Swans appear to be – gasp! – enjoying themselves; they’re still staring into the abyss but the abyss is no longer staring back." He also noted that the album: "displays much more diversity than its immediate predecessors." Louis Pattison of Uncut wrote, "Yet as the name suggests To Be Kind does feature a quality hitherto rare in Swans: that of tenderness." He also further stated, "Michael Gira is not only still moving forward but making some of the albums of his career."

To Be Kind received a "perfect 10" from Anthony Fantano of The Needle Drop, one of only seven contemporary albums to have ever received such a score to date.

While the album's reception was overwhelmingly positive, some reviews were more mixed. Jon Dennis of The Guardian described the album as "uncompromising to the point of overindulgence" and felt that the lengthy track "Bring the Sun/Toussaint L'Ouverture" was "like The Doors playing "The End" for ever only without the easygoing bonhomie."

Track listing

The European vinyl version was pressed incorrectly, leading "Oxygen" to be placed on side 5 before "Kirsten Supine" on the record, despite the packaging listing them in the correct order.

Personnel
Adapted from the official Young God Records website:

Swans
 Michael Gira – vocals, electric and acoustic guitar, production
 Christoph Hahn – lap steel guitars, electric guitar, vocals
 Thor Harris – drums, percussion, vibes and bells, wind instruments, handmade viola, vocals
 Christopher Pravdica – bass guitar, acoustic guitar, vocals
 Phil Puleo – drums, percussion, dulcimer, piano, keyboards, vocals
 Norman Westberg – electric guitar, acoustic guitar, vocals
Guest performers'
 Bill Rieflin – additional drums and percussion, synthesizer, piano, electric guitar, bass guitar, keyboards (credited as "Honorary Swan Forever")
 Jennifer Church – background vocals on "She Loves Us" and "A Little God in My Hands"
 John Congleton – piano
 Rex Emerson – mandolin
 Daniel Hart – violin
 Julia Kent – strings and string arrangement on "Some Things We Do"
 Sean Kirkpatrick – piano, harpsichord, synthesizer
 Little Annie – vocals on "Some Things We Do"
 Al Spx – background vocals on "Bring the Sun"
 St. Vincent – background vocals on "Nathalie Neal", "Bring the Sun", "Screen Shot", and "Kirsten Supine"
 David Pierce – trombone
 Evan Weiss – trumpet
 John Congleton – recording, mixing
 Doug Henderson – mastering
 Bob Biggs – artwork

Charts

Release history

Notes

References

External links
 

2014 albums
Swans (band) albums
Albums produced by Michael Gira
Young God Records albums
Mute Records albums
Crowdfunded albums
Albums recorded at Sonic Ranch